The 2014 Toyota/Save Mart 350 was a NASCAR Sprint Cup Series stock car race that was held on June 22, 2014, at Sonoma Raceway in Sonoma, California. Contested over 110 laps on the  road course, it was the 16th race of the 2014 NASCAR Sprint Cup Series, and the first of two road course competitions on the schedule. Carl Edwards won the race, his second win of the season and first on a road course in Sprint Cup competition. Jeff Gordon finished second, while Dale Earnhardt Jr., Jamie McMurray, and Paul Menard rounded out the top five. The top rookies of the race were Austin Dillon (17th), Cole Whitt (27th), and Kyle Larson (28th).

Previous week's race
Jimmie Johnson took the lead with ten laps to go to win the Quicken Loans 400 at Michigan International Speedway. This was his first career win at Michigan. "We had figured out every way to lose this race," Johnson said after winning at Michigan for the first time in 25 tries. "And today we were able to get it done. "We really were in a win-win situation," he added. "Those guys still had to come to pit road to make it to the end. Once I got an idea of how the race was unfolding, I knew we were in the catbird seat and were able to take advantage of it. When it came down to strategy in the end, which we all knew it would at Michigan, Chad nailed the strategy."

Report

Background

The course, Sonoma Raceway, is one of two road courses to hold NASCAR races, the other being Watkins Glen International. The Chute was only used for NASCAR events such as this race, and was criticized by many drivers, who preferred the full layout. Martin Truex Jr. was the defending race winner from 2013.

Two teams elected to replace their standard drivers with road course ringers. Boris Said took over the Go FAS Racing No. 32 Ford, while Tomy Drissi drove the No. 66 Toyota for Identity Ventures Racing.

Entry list
The entry list for the Toyota/Save Mart 350 was released on Monday, June 15, 2014 at 1:03 p.m. Eastern time. Forty-three drivers were entered for the race.

Practice

First practice

Final practice

Qualifying

"This race is about having good strategy and having a little bit of luck," McMurray said. "It's about not getting run into in Turn 4 or Turn 7 on a restart. I've run enough races here that I've had every issue you could have with running out of gas ... to getting wrecked in Turn 7 on a restart because someone from 15th dive-bombed me into the corner with no chance of making it." "Well that wasn't what we expected," Bowyer said. "We were fast all day (Friday), just didn't have enough grip and missed Turn 4. We will just have to pass a few more cars (Sunday)."

Qualifying results

Race

First half

Start

The race was scheduled to start at 3:15 p.m. Eastern time, but started seven minutes later, with Jamie McMurray leading the field to the green. A. J. Allmendinger put pressure on him for the first few laps but was unable to take the lead. Defending race winner Martin Truex Jr. made an unscheduled stop on lap seven for a vibration, while Allmendinger wrested the lead from McMurray on lap nine. Kyle Busch nicked Brad Keselowski in turn 11, which forced Keselowski down the order by 8 spots. While describing his car as "bad", Keselowski reckoned he "deserved to get spun out". Kevin Harvick took the lead from Allmendinger on lap 22, before the first caution of the race came out on lap 31 after Landon Cassill blew an engine. During pit stops under the caution, Allmendinger retook the lead. Allmendinger led the field to the green on the restart on lap 35. Casey Mears got boxed in at turn 7a and sustained heavy damage that forced him to make an unscheduled pit stop the next lap, while Kasey Kahne also sustained damage.

Second half
McMurray retook the lead from Allmendinger on lap 54, before he pulled off to pit and handed the lead to Jeff Gordon. Harvick was able to take the lead from Gordon, when Gordon pitted on lap 58. The second caution of the race occurred on lap 61, as Ryan Truex stalled in the esses. Most of the cars on the lead lap stayed out, with Harvick leading the field to the restart on lap 65. Jimmie Johnson took the lead from Harvick exiting turn 4, before the third caution of the race came out on lap 71 for debris. Joey Logano stayed out during the cycle of pit stops under caution to take the lead. The race restarted on lap 75 with Clint Bowyer taking the lead from Logano, going into turn 7a. The fourth caution flew for a hard wreck in the esses. Dale Earnhardt Jr.'s car hopped over a curb, and collided with Matt Kenseth and sent him head on into the tire barriers. He was able to extricate himself from his wrecked car.

Closing stage
The race restarted on lap 80 with Bowyer leading the field but he surrendered the lead to Marcos Ambrose in turn 1. Johnson also passed Bowyer for second, going into turn 11. Bowyer was then turned around by McMurray and was then hit by Harvick. Harvick's stranded car forced the race to go under caution for the fifth time. The race restarted with 25 laps to go with Ambrose leading the way but he lost the lead to Carl Edwards. Earnhardt Jr. pinned Allmendinger into the wall coming to the line, causing substantial damage to Allmendinger's car. Ricky Stenhouse Jr. was hit by Brian Vickers to bring out the sixth caution, with 20 laps to go.

Finish
The race was restarted 16 laps to go and Edwards held off a last lap charge by Gordon to win for the first time on a road course, in NASCAR. He later described his race as "real tough", and his victory as "very special". Gordon stated that he had been "overdriving" his car, and he wished he "had just stayed smooth and stuck with it", while chasing Edwards towards the end. The victory would be the one and only road course victory Edwards would win in the NASCAR Cup Series.

Race results

Race summary
 Lead changes: 11 among different drivers
 Cautions/Laps: 6 for 19
 Red flags: 0
 Time of race: 2 hours, 51 minutes and 30 seconds
 Average speed:

Media

Television

Radio

Standings after the race

Drivers' Championship standings

Manufacturers' Championship standings

Note: Only the first sixteen positions are included for the driver standings.

Note

References

Toyota Save Mart 350
Toyota Save Mart 350
Toyota Save Mart 350
NASCAR races at Sonoma Raceway